Ryparken station is an S-train station in Copenhagen, Denmark. It serves as an interchange station between the Ring line and Farum radial. It is serviced by the B, F, and H. The station was originally named Lyngbyvej Station it was renamed in 1972 to Ryparken Station.

History

Ryparken Station opened on 1 February 1926.

See also
 List of railway stations in Denmark
 Rail transport in Denmark

References

External links

S-train (Copenhagen) stations
Railway stations opened in 1926
Railway stations in Denmark opened in the 20th century